The Kukës Arena is a stadium in Kukës, Albania. It is primarily used for football matches and it is the home ground of Kategoria Superiore club Kukësi. The stadium was built on the site of the pre-existing Përparimi Stadium, located near the centre of Kukës on Rruga Stadiumi (Stadium Road).

History

Ilirjan Thaçi

During a friendly game between FK Kukësi U17 and KF Liria U17 on 30 November 2013, 17 year old footballer Ilirjan Thaçi collapsed and died on field following a heart attack related to a previously undetected heart problem. Thaçi was born in 1995 and he was a defender on the books at FK Kukësi, his hometown club where he was also a lifelong supporter. He collapsed during the tenth minute of the friendly game and he died having suffered a myocardial infarction, despite efforts to resuscitate him. A minutes silence was held before every game in Albania the following weekend in memory of Thaçi, and there were also calls for the Zeqir Ymeri Stadium to be renamed after Thaçi. A mini tournament was held in his memory consisting of six youth sides from Albania and Kosovo, which was organised by FK Kukësi's president Safet Gjici.

Gallery

References

Football venues in Albania
FK Kukësi